Tommy Cook (born July 5, 1930) is an American producer, screenwriter and actor. He came up with the story for the 1977 American disaster-suspense film Rollercoaster, starring George Segal. Cook also voiced Augie Anderson and Biff on Hanna-Barbera's animated series The Funky Phantom and Jabberjaw.

Film
Cook played a villainous tribesboy opposite Johnny Weissmuller in Tarzan and the Leopard Woman, a "nice native lad" in Jungle Girl (a serial), and Little Beaver in the serial version of Adventures of Red Ryder.

He would later help write and produce Rollercoaster, as well as Players, starring Ali MacGraw.

Radio and television
Cook started his career on radio. He played Little Beaver on the radio series Red Ryder. He also played Alexander on Blondie and Junior on The Life of Riley.

On television, Cook appeared in a 1961 episode of The Tab Hunter Show. He had voice-over roles on animated series such as Kid Flash on The Superman/Aquaman Hour of Adventure, Augie on The Funky Phantom and Biff on Jabberjaw.

Cook returned to acting in 2017, making guest appearances on Better Things and Space Force.

Military service
In the 1950s, Cook was a corporal in the United States Marine Corps.

Filmography

Film

Television

Radio 
Red Ryder
Blondie
The Life of Riley
Lux Radio Theatre
The Adventures of Ozzie and Harriet
Arch Oboler's Plays
Yours Truly, Johnny Dollar

References

Bibliography
Holmstrom, John. The Moving Picture Boy: An International Encyclopaedia from 1895 to 1995, Norwich, Michael Russell, 1996, p. 169. .

External links
 

Tommy Cook at Voice Chasers
1991 Audio Interview with Tommy Cook on Speaking of Radio.com

1930 births
Living people
American male radio actors
American male voice actors
American male film actors
American male child actors
Male actors from Duluth, Minnesota
American male screenwriters
Screenwriters from Minnesota
Film producers from Minnesota